Orwell Park School is a day and boarding preparatory school for boys and girls in the village of Nacton on the edge of Ipswich in the English county of Suffolk. Founded in 1868 in Lowestoft, the school currently accommodates around 300 boys and girls between the ages of 2½ and 13 years. It is a member of the IAPS.

Present school
The School is split in to two sections:
Pre-Prep School (Nursery – Year 2, ages 2½-7)
Prep School (Year 3 – Year 8, ages 7–13)

The school's curriculum includes English, maths, sciences, humanities, art, music, TPR, modern foreign languages, classics (including Latin and Greek) as well as computing and life skills.

History
The school was founded by the Reverend Walter Wilkinson in Lowestoft in 1868, then known as Crespigny House. It moved to Aldeburgh in 1870, changing its name to Eaton House and then Aldeburgh Lodge. The school finally moved to its present location of Nacton in 1937, being renamed again as Orwell Park.

During World War II, the school was evacuated, first to Devon, and then Shropshire. As part of preparations for the D-Day landings, Orwell School was used by the 7th Armoured Division (The Desert Rats) as a training location due to its sloped terrain leading down to estuary of the River Orwell.

Whilst originally admitting only boys, girls were first accepted in 1992. Former pupils of the school are known as 'Old Orwellians'.

History of the buildings

According to Pevsner, the main school building dates to c. 1770, built by the family of Admiral Edward Vernon.  It was acquired by Colonel George Tomline in 1848, who proceeded to extend and modify the building and grounds.  Most notably, this included the addition of an observatory containing a 26 cm refracting telescope, known as the Tomline Refractor, that is still in use today.

Other than the main school building itself, there are other grade II listed buildings nearby, such as the Water Tower, Orangery and Clock Tower.  The Pre-Prep classrooms are in a separate, purpose-built building, completed in 2013.

== Locations ==

Over the years the school has existed at several locations

* 23 Wellington Esplanade, Lowestoft 1868-1870

* Crespigny House, Aldeburgh 1870-1884

* Eaton Lodge, Aldeburgh 1884-1904

* Aldeburgh Lodge 1904-1915 & 1919-1937

* Rushbrooke Park, Bury St. Edmunds 1915-1919

* Orwell Park 1937-1940 & 1946-date

* Hembury Fort House, Devon & [[Bedstone Court|Bedstone Cour]]<nowiki/>t, Shropshire 1940-1946

== Headmasters ==

Over the years the school has had the following headmasters

* Rev Walter George Wilkinson (1829-1906) 1868-1903

* Maurice Emra Wilkinson (1874-1947), & John Frederick Spurgeon (1874-1946) 1903-1946

* Noel Hawtrey Wilkinson (1908-1983), Edward Cawston, & [[Brian Belle|Brian Henry Belle]] (1914-2007) 1946-1979

* Ian Angus 1979-1993

* Paddy Heazell 1993-1994

* Andrew Auster 1994-2007

* Paul Forte, Brian Hunt, & Rowland Constantine 2007-2011

* Adrian Brown 2011-date

Sports and other activities
The usual range of sports are offered at the school, for both boys and girls, including: rugby, hockey and cricket, with football, golf, sailing, skiing, swimming and tennis also available.

The School runs the Orwell Park Challenge  for older pupils to promote personal development outside of the classroom.

Orwell Park School has forged links with Mayo College in Ajmer, Rajasthan, India, with staff and pupils from both schools undertaking several exchange visits over the past few years.

The upcoming film School's Out Forever, based on Scott K. Andrews's book School's Out was shot in part at the school.

References

 Edwina Langley. Orwell Park School. A Celebration of 150 Years (1868-2018), pub. Fruit Design, 2018

External links
School Website
Profile on the ISC website
Profile on the Good Schools Guide

Private schools in Suffolk
1868 establishments in England
Preparatory schools in Suffolk
Boarding schools in Suffolk
Educational institutions established in 1868
Grade II listed buildings in Suffolk
Astronomical observatories in England
Nacton